Étinehem is a former commune in the Somme department in Hauts-de-France in northern France. On 1 January 2017, it was merged into the new commune Étinehem-Méricourt.

Geography

Places of interest
 Church of Saint Peter (1866)
 Saint Anne's chapel
 The lakes of the Haute Somme
 Ancient ruined windmill

Population

See also
Communes of the Somme department

References

Former communes of Somme (department)
Populated places disestablished in 2017